Embrun Cathedral is a Roman Catholic church and former cathedral located in the town of Embrun, Hautes-Alpes, France.

The cathedral is a national monument and was the seat of the former Archbishopric of Embrun, which was divided between the Bishopric of Gap and the Archbishopric of Aix in 1822. On its door were posted in 1489 the thirty-two propositions imputed to the Waldenses, that presaged the campaign to extirpate them as heretics, which resurfaced in the Dauphiné with intense savagery during the Wars of Religion in France: Lesdiguières pillaged Embrun Cathedral in 1585. This saw the destruction of a fresco, probably painted in the 13th century, representing the Madonna, which had been the object of a celebrated pilgrimage for many centuries.

In the fifth century relics of St Nazarius were translated to Embrun, which had supported a bishop since the fourth century; Embrun became a noted place of pilgrimage. Charlemagne erected the basilica that was visited by Pope Leo III.  The cathedral church, built on foundations that date to its founding in the ninth century, was constructed between 1170 and 1220; its Romanesque portal, columns supported on crouching lions in the north portal and striped stonework courses in cream and gray stone express cultural links with Lombardy. The interior has an elaborate Baroque high altar inlaid in colored marbles, recently rediscovered frescoes, an organ (the oldest working in France) donated by Louis XI of France, who habitually sported in his cap a leaden emblem of the Virgin of Embrun, and whose last words were addressed to "Nôtre Dame d'Embrun, ma bonne maîtress, ayez pitié de moi".

Notes

External links
 

Former cathedrals in France
Churches in Hautes-Alpes